ME Group International plc based in Epsom, Surrey is a vending machine operator. Long known as a photobooth operator, it has since expanded to laundry, digital printing and food.

It became a public limited company in 1963, as Photo Me International plc, and has built operations in several countries including China, Japan, South Korea, Germany and France in addition to the UK.

History 

The Company's shares have been listed on the London Stock Exchange since 1962.

Its chief executive Serge Crasnianski is infamous for selling shares at the height of the Dot-com bubble when investors bet photobooths would provide internet services on the go.

In 2007 a shareholder revolt over plans to sell off the vending division forced Vernon Sankey and Serge Crasnianski to resign.

Three directors cashed out share options before a profit warning in 2007, causing great concern among shareholders. The financial Services Authority subsequently fined the company half a million pounds for not informing the markets in a timely manner.

Serge Crasnianski was reappointed to the board as a non-executive director in May 2009. He was subsequently appointed Deputy Chairman and Joint Chief Executive and in May 2010 assumed the role of Chief Executive. Following his reappointment, a major restructuring was carried out at KIS and the Group after losses of £6.3 million in 2008 and recorded a pre-tax profit of £1.6 million in the year ending April 30, 2009. In the year to 30 April 2010, the Group’s loss-making wholesale photo-processing labs business was sold and pre-tax profits were reported at £14 million. Of note was the £31.6 million improvement in the overall cash position such that the net cash on the Balance Sheet was £8.1 million compared to net debt of £23.5 million the previous year.

Canary Wharf in London has installed the company's photo booths but in this case they are ones designed in conjunction with Philippe Stark.

The company has diversified into the laundry business, with a division called 'Revolution'. Revolution is a 24/7 outdoor self-service launderette.

In November 2016 it was announced that the company had bought the photo division of Asda stores, taking over the supermarket's 191 photo centres and 172 self-service kiosks.

The company's chairman, John H. J. Lewis, was knighted by the Honours Committee in the 2019 New Year Honours. Critics noted that Lewis had donated approximately £390,000 to the Conservative Party since 2006.

It was renamed to ME Group in 2022 to reflect the expansion beyond the declining photobooth segment.

References

External links
ME Group plc
German Subsidiary of Photo-Me
Profit concerns
Reuters article on Crasniaski buy back

Photography equipment
Vending machines